Tinissa rigida is a moth of the family Tineidae. It is found from Kai Island to New Guinea and has also been recorded from Kuranda, Queensland, Australia.

The larvae probably feed on fungi growing on trees in forests.

External links
Australian Faunal Directory
Moths of Australia

Moths of Australia
Scardiinae
Moths of New Guinea
Moths of Indonesia
Moths described in 1910